Hello, Frisco, Hello is a 1943 American musical film directed by H. Bruce Humberstone and starring Alice Faye, John Payne, Lynn Bari, and Jack Oakie. The film was made in Technicolor and released by 20th Century-Fox. This was one of the last musicals made by Faye for Fox, and in later interviews Faye said it was clear Fox was promoting Betty Grable as her successor. Released at the height of World War II, the film became one of Faye's highest-grossing pictures for Fox.

The film tells the story of vaudeville performers in San Francisco, during the period of the 1915 Panama Pacific Exposition when Alexander Graham Bell made the first transcontinental phone call from New York City to San Francisco. The movie introduced the song "You'll Never Know", which was sung by Alice Faye and won an Academy Award for Best Original Song. Although Faye never made an official recording of the song, it is often named as her signature song. Hello, Frisco, Hello was also nominated for an Academy Award for Best Color Cinematography, losing to Phantom of the Opera.

The opening sequence, in its entirety, is used in the film Nob Hill (1945), as is the basic plot.

This film is a remake of King of Burlesque (1936).

Cast

Reception
The film made a profit of $1,233,200.

Accolades
The film is recognized by American Film Institute in these lists:
 2004: AFI's 100 Years...100 Songs:	
 "You'll Never Know" – Nominated

References

External links

 
 
 
 
 
 

1943 films
1943 musical comedy films
20th Century Fox films
American musical comedy films
Films that won the Best Original Song Academy Award
1940s English-language films
Films directed by H. Bruce Humberstone
Films set in California
Films set in San Francisco
Films set in 1915
Films set in the 1910s
Jukebox musical films
1940s American films